M38 or M-38 may refer to:

 Willys M38, a light tactical vehicle, successor of the Willys MB
 M38 Wolfhound, a prototype American armoured car designed in 1944
 M-38 (Michigan highway), a state highway in Michigan
 M38 (Cape Town), a Metropolitan Route in Cape Town, South Africa
 M38 (Johannesburg), a Metropolitan Route in Johannesburg, South Africa
 M38 highway (Kazakhstan), a road connecting the border to Russia near Omsk and  Georgiyevka
 Miles M.38 Messenger, a 1942 British four-seat liaison aircraft 
 Messier 38, an open star cluster in the constellation Auriga
 Model 1938 Carbine, a version of the Mosin-Nagant rifle
 HMS Atherstone (M38) a British minesweeper
 MAS-38, a French WWII submachine gun
 M38 DMR, a designated marksman rifle used by the United States Marine Corps since 2017